Pierre-Alexis Ponsot (born 8 May 1975 in Granville, Manche) is a French sailor, who specialized in two-person keelboat (Star) class. He represented France, along with his partner and six-time Olympian Xavier Rohart at the 2012 Summer Olympics, and has also been training for Ouest Nautical Sports Club throughout most of his sporting career. As of September 2014, Leboucher is ranked forty-first in the world for fleet racing and keelboat by the International Sailing Federation, following his successes at the 2011 ISAF Sailing World Championships and 2012 Star World Championships.

Ponsot qualified as a crew member for the French squad in the Star class at the 2012 Summer Olympics in London by finishing ninth and receiving a berth from the ISAF World Championships in Perth, Western Australia. Teaming with his partner Rohart in the opening series, the French duo delivered a powerful lead in the first leg, but came up short for the podium with an accumulated net score of 86 points and a satisfying ninth position against a fleet of sixteen boats.

References

External links
 
 
 
 
 

1975 births
Living people
French male sailors (sport)
Olympic sailors of France
Sailors at the 2012 Summer Olympics – Star
People from Granville, Manche
Sportspeople from Manche